Josef Turek (born November 15, 1971) is a Czech ice hockey coach and former player.

Turek was most recently head coach of MHk 32 Liptovský Mikuláš of the Tipsport Liga for the 2020–21 season, but was fired on September 2, 2020 after just two pre-season games which included a 13-2 loss to HK Dukla Trenčín.

Before coaching, Turek played as a forward most notably for HC Plzeň of the Czechoslovak First Ice Hockey League and HKm Nitra of the Slovak Extraliga.

References

External links

1971 births
Living people
HC Baník Sokolov players
HC Berounští Medvědi players
Czech ice hockey coaches
Czech ice hockey forwards
SHK Hodonín players
HC Karlovy Vary players
HC Kometa Brno players
KHL Medveščak Zagreb players
HK Nitra players
IHC Písek players
HC Plzeň players
VHK Vsetín players
Czech expatriate ice hockey players in Slovakia
Czech expatriate sportspeople in Croatia
Expatriate ice hockey players in Croatia